The Virginia Cavaliers women's lacrosse team is an NCAA Division I college lacrosse team representing the University of Virginia as part of the Atlantic Coast Conference. They play their home games at Klöckner Stadium in Charlottesville, Virginia.

History

In its over 40-year history, Virginia has only had three head coaches: Linda Southworth, Jane Miller, and Julie Myers.

Linda Southworth era (1976–83)

Linda Southworth was hired as the Cavaliers' first head coach in 1975, with the first team fielded the following year. She had been a part of Longwood's first women's lacrosse team, then taught and coached at Huguenot High School, before taking the position at Virginia. In her eight-year tenure, the team went 58–37–5. She guided the program into the NCAA era, and during her time in Charlottesville, she also coached field hockey at UVa and started a local girls' middle school lacrosse league. After leaving the University of Virginia, she became the Athletics Director at St. Catherine's School in Richmond. In 2005 she was inducted into the Virginia Lacrosse Hall of Fame. As of 2012, she is still coaching girls' JV lacrosse at St. Catherine's.

Jane Miller era (1984–95)

In 1984, Jane Miller was hired as the program's second coach. Miller was a 1973 graduate of Northeastern University, where she had been a standout in basketball, field hockey, and lacrosse. In her twelve seasons, Miller compiled a record of 145–44, including six final fours and national championships in 1991 and 1993. She was awarded the IWLCA Coach of the Year in 1991 for her efforts in bringing home the program's first national title. She left after the 1995 season to accept a full-time administrative role. The next year, she was inducted into the Virginia Lacrosse Hall of Fame, and was also voted into the U.S. Lacrosse National Hall of Fame in 2003. Since 2001, she has served as the senior associate director of athletics for programs and senior woman administrator. In 2014 she was appointed to the NCAA Division I Board of Directors.

Julie Myers era (1996–)

Julie Myers, a 1990 graduate of Virginia, returned to her alma mater six years later to assume the head coaching position. She has led the Cavaliers to a postseason berth in all 22 of her seasons in Charlottesville, a feat unmatched by any other coach at the Division I level. Virginia's 22 straight appearances are also the second-most behind Maryland. As of the conclusion of the 2018 season, Myers has led the Cavs to a 30–22 postseason record and the 2004 national title, in addition to championship game appearances in 1996, 1998, 1999, 2003, 2005, and 2007. The Cavaliers have been ranked in the IWLCA Coaches' Poll for all but four weeks of Myers' tenure. In 2017, Myers won her 300th game, becoming just the fourth Division I coach to reach that mark.

In 2010, the women's lacrosse program garnered national attention after one of its players, Yeardley Love, was beaten to death by her ex-boyfriend, men's lacrosse player George Huguely, on May 3. Huguely was arrested later that day and charged with second-degree murder. He was sentenced to prison in 2012 and is scheduled to be released in 2029. In September 2010, Love's family created the One Love Foundation, which aims to raise awareness about relationship violence.

Awards
Reference:

NCAA awards

National Hall of Fame
Julie Williams – 2002
Heather Dow – 2002
Jane Miller – 2003
Cherie Greer – 2009
Bonnie Rosen – 2010

NCAA Woman of the Year
Peggy Boutilier – 1998

Honda Sports Award
Amy Appelt – 2003–04

NCAA Top VIII
Peggy Boutilier – 1999

Tewaaraton Trophy
Amy Appelt – 2004

NCAA Elite 89 Award
Courtney Swan – 2014

IWLCA awards

Coach of the Year
Jane Miller – 1991
Julie Myers – 2004

Assistant Coach of the Year
Colleen Shearer – 2010

Offensive Player of the Year
Jenny Slingluff – 1992
Amy Appelt – 2004

Defensive Player of the Year
Robyn Nye – 1991
Cherie Greer – 1994
Peggy Boutilier – 1997, 1998

Goalkeeper of the Year
Michelle Cusimano – 1995, 1996

ACC awards
Reference:

Player of the Year
Peggy Boutilier – 1998
Amy Appelt – 2004

Freshman of the Year
Amy Fromal – 1997
Mills Hook – 1998
Caitlin Banks – 2001
Amy Appelt – 2002
Blair Weymouth – 2006
Brittany Kalkstein – 2007
Rachel Vander Kolk – 2015

Coach of the Year
Julie Myers – 2002, 2008

Tournament MVP
Kara Ariza – 1998
Ashleigh Haas – 2004
Tyler Leachman – 2006
Kendall McBrearty – 2007, 2008

Individual career records
Reference:

Individual single-season records

Seasons

Postseason Results

The Cavaliers have appeared in 31 NCAA tournaments. Their postseason record is 36–28.

References

External links
Team page

 
Lacrosse teams in Virginia
1976 establishments in Virginia
Lacrosse clubs established in 1976